Urosaurus is a genus of lizards, commonly known as tree lizards or brush lizards, belonging to the New World family Phrynosomatidae.

Description
Species in the genus Urosaurus can be distinguished from members of the genus Sceloporus by the presence of a gular (under neck) fold and granular lateral scales.  They can be distinguished from members of the genus Uta by the presence of enlarged (sometimes only slightly) dorsal scales.

It is important to note that these lizards come from a different family than lizards like the common side-blotched lizard which comes from the family 'Uta'.

Reproduction
Urosaurus have been used as a model system in lizard life-history studies, and populations produce two or more clutches of eggs per year. Field studies have also shown a cost of reproduction in a natural New Mexico population of the species Urosaurus ornatus.

Species
In the genus Urosaurus there are 8 species which are recognized as being valid.
Urosaurus auriculatus 
Urosaurus bicarinatus 
Urosaurus clarionensis 
Urosaurus gadovi 
Urosaurus graciosus 
Urosaurus lahtelai 
Urosaurus nigricauda 
Urosaurus ornatus

Etymology
The specific name, gadovi, is in honor of German ornithologist Hans Friedrich Gadow.

References

Further reading
Hallowell E (1854). "Descriptions of new Reptiles from California". Proc. Acad. Nat. Sci. Philadelphia 7: 91–97. (Urosaurus, new genus, p. 92).

Urosaurus
Lizards of Central America
Lizards of North America
Lizard genera
Taxa named by Edward Hallowell (herpetologist)